BleachBit is a free and open-source disk space cleaner, privacy manager, and computer system optimizer. The BleachBit source code is licensed under the GNU General Public License version 3.

History
BleachBit was first publicly released on 24 December 2008 for Linux systems. The 0.2.1 release created some controversy by suggesting Linux needed a registry cleaner.

Version 0.4.0 introduced CleanerML, a standards-based markup language for writing new cleaners. On May 29, 2009, BleachBit version 0.5.0 added support for Windows XP, Windows Vista, and Windows 7. On September 16, 2009, version 0.6.4 introduced command-line interface support.

BleachBit is available for download through its website and the repositories of many Linux distributions.

Features
Identifying and removing Web cache, HTTP cookies, URL history, temporary files log files and Flash cookies for Firefox, Opera, Safari, APT, Google Chrome
Removing unused localizations (also called locale files) which are translations of software
Shredding files and wiping unallocated disk space to minimize data remanence
Wiping unallocated disk space to improve data compression ratio for disk image backups
Vacuuming Firefox's SQLite database which suffers fragmentation
Command line interface for scripting automation and headless operation

Technology
BleachBit is written in the Python programming language and uses PyGTK.

Most of BleachBit's cleaners are written in CleanerML, an open standard XML-based markup language for writing cleaners. CleanerML deals not only with deleting files, but also executes more specialized actions, such as vacuuming an SQLite database (used, for example, to clean Yum).

BleachBit's file shredder uses only a single, "secure" pass because its developers believe that there is a lack of evidence that multiple passes, such as the 35-pass Gutmann method, are more effective. They also assert that multiple passes are significantly slower and may give the user a false sense of security by overshadowing other ways in which privacy may be compromised.

Controversy

In August 2016, Republican U.S. Congressman Trey Gowdy announced that he had seen notes from the Federal Bureau of Investigation (FBI), taken during an investigation of Hillary Clinton's emails, that stated that her staff had used BleachBit in order to delete tens of thousands of emails on her private server. Subsequently, then presidential nominee Donald Trump claimed Clinton had “acid washed” and “bleached” her emails, calling it “an expensive process.” 

After the announcement, BleachBit's company website reportedly received increased traffic. In October 2016, the FBI released edited documents from their Clinton email investigation.

See also
AVG PC TuneUp
Desktop Cleanup Wizard
Disk Cleanup
Eraser (software)
CCleaner
Norton Utilities

References

External links

Review by Downloadsquad (June 9, 2009)
Review by SoftPedia (September 16, 2009)
Review by CNET (January 19, 2011)

2008 software
Cross-platform free software
Data erasure software
Free multilingual software
Free software programmed in Python
Software that uses PyGTK
Software using the GPL license
Utilities for Linux
Utilities for Windows